Romney Street is a hamlet in the civil parish of Shoreham, in the Sevenoaks district, in the English county of Kent.

Location
It is about 4 miles north east of the town of Sevenoaks and about 1.6 miles north of the large village of Kemsing.

Nearby hamlets
Nearby hamlets include East Hill, Woodlands, Knatts Valley, Maplescombe, Knockmill and Cotmans Ash.

Transport
For transport there is the A20 road, the A225 road, the M20 motorway, the M26 motorway and the M25 motorway nearby. The nearest railway station is Otford railway station, which is 1.7 miles away.

References
 A-Z Great Britain Road Atlas (page 181)

Hamlets in Kent
Sevenoaks District